Wolverton is a constituent town of Milton Keynes, England. It is located in north-west Milton Keynes, beside the West Coast Main Line, the Grand Union Canal and the river Great Ouse. It is the administrative seat of Wolverton and Greenleys civil parish.

It is one of the places in historic Buckinghamshire that went into the foundation of Milton Keynes in 1967.

The village recorded in Domesday is known today as Old Wolverton but, because of peasant clearances in the early 17th century, only field markings remain of the medieval settlement.

History

Old Wolverton

The town name is an Old English language word, and means 'Wulfhere's settlement'. It was recorded in the Domesday Book of 1086 as Wluerintone. The original Wolverton was a medieval settlement just north and west of today's town. This site is now known as Old Wolverton, although the medieval village is all but gone. The ridge and furrow pattern of agriculture can still be seen in the nearby fields.

The Saxon Church of the Holy Trinity (rebuilt in 1819) still sits next to the Norman Motte and Bailey site. Only the earth mound remains of the Norman castle, though the Saxon tower still stands as central to the rebuilt church, clad in the early 19th century 'Anglo-Norman' style. Next door to the church is a house built in 1729 which later became the vicarage; the front door has stonework from the nearby, demolished manor house of the 16th century including the de Longueville family coat of arms, and pieces from the earlier church building. A talbot (dog), another symbol of the family, once graced the side-entrance which now marks the boundary between the ground floor of the house and its downstairs toilet.

The manor of Wolverton was held by the de Wolverton family until the mid-fourteenth century. Sir John de Wolverton died in 1349 leaving an infant son, Ralph, who died in 1351, and two daughters. The elder daughter Margaret or Margery, married John le Hunt, Lord Chief Justice of Ireland,  and  had in turn one daughter, Joan le Hunt, who married John Longueville of Billing, Northamptonshire.   They had at least one son, George, through whom Wolverton passed by inheritance to the Longueville/Longville family.

Of the historic village itself, only field patterns marking a deserted village remain, along with two village ponds. The desertion of Old Wolverton was due to enclosure of the large strip cultivation fields into small "closes" by the local landlords, the Longville family, who turned arable land over to pasture. By 1654, the family had completely enclosed the parish. With the end of the feudal system, the peasants had lost their land and tillage/grazing rights and were forced to find other work or starve. Thus Old Wolverton was reduced from about thirty peasant families in the mid 16th century to almost none, within the space of a century.

Canal village
The Grand Union Canal passes around the northern and eastern edge of the modern town. The canal originally crossed the River Great Ouse by descending 10 metres to the river by nine locks, crossing the river on the level and ascended by eight locks on the other side. This was time consuming for navigators and subject to disruption in time of flood.

Railway town

In 1838, Wolverton was established as the site of the locomotive repair shop at the midpoint of the London and Birmingham Railway then under construction.  In 1846 the  became part of the London and North Western Railway, who subsequently decided that locomotives would be built and repaired at Crewe. The last locomotives at Wolverton were built in 1863 and repaired until 1877, after which it concentrated on carriages including railway owned road vehicles. The Works has been the home of the Royal Train fleet. During the Second World War, the Works built parts for Lee–Enfield rifles, bomber plane timber frames, Hawker Typhoon wings, Horsa Gliders, and ambulances. Like many older industrial sites, camouflage paint from the period can still be seen on the factory buildings. A pillbox remains opposite the Works Wall.

The railway company built some 200 houses for its workers by 1844 along with schools, a church and a market. L&NW also invited George McCorquodale to establish what became a substantial printing works in the town.

Church of St George the Martyr
A new Anglican parish church was built in 1843 to serve the new town centre: like the Church of the Holy Trinity in Old Wolverton, it is a listed building rated a II*.

Historic football ground
The football ground beside the railway works and the station was home to the works team and subsequently to Wolverton Town football club. The stand, built in 1899, is believed to be the oldest covered football stand in the world. It was set to be demolished by September 2006 because its owners wished to redevelop the site for housing and a community park. The development went ahead and a replica stand now sits on the original site to mark the significance of the original construction, painted green as it used to be.

The Wolverton Agora
The Agora Centre was built by the Milton Keynes Development Corporation in 1978 to replace the old market hall in Creed Street. The Agora Centre was known for its shops as well as regular roller-disco events throughout the 1980s. 

The building was either loved and hated by residents who either viewed the building as a community asset or as a blight on the town that split the town in two (due to the size of the site). The building was often called a "spaceship" and, when redevelopment plans were released, a "farewell" ceremony was held for the building at the 2019 Wolverton Lantern Festival where the "Agoran" aliens (represented by remote controlled robots) returned to the Agora and shut the shutters for the final time.

The Agora Centre was demolished in 2022 and is due to be replaced with a development which reinstates the original Victorian road structure and a plans to include 86 new properties and 8 shops. 

Another Agora Centre is currently open for business in Bletchley's high street, Queensway.

Listed buildings and structures
, Wolverton and Greenleys civil parish has two scheduled monuments  and two Grade II* listed buildings.
There are a further 38 Grade II listed buildings or objects in the parish.

Green spaces

Wolverton was built with a park (Victoria Park) with a cricket ground, an expanse of allotments for the country people who became the railway works employees, and access to the footpaths to north and south. An extensive section of the River Great Ouse flood plain to the north of Wolverton has been excavated for sand and gravel and the resulting area developed into a nature reserve of flood-tolerant trees, called the Flood Plain Forest.

Secret Garden
In 1999 a group of Wolverton residents clubbed together to persuade Railtrack to sell to the Town Council a piece of derelict land for £1. The council then leased the land to the residents' group for a garden to be created.  This piece of land, which sits alongside the Grand Union Canal, has been turned into a small park known locally as the “Secret Garden”, something the residents felt was missing from the largely industrial area.  It is maintained by volunteers and hosts outdoor music events in the summer months. It is open to all throughout the year.

Previously the garden was the site of several townhouses built in the early Victorian era for the railways. One of the houses was the residence of the station master for Wolverton.  Now the foundations and cellars of two of these houses have been excavated and form a feature in the “Secret Garden”.

Education
The town has a secondary school (the Radcliffe School), a primary school (Bushfields) and a special school (Slated Row).

Transport

Road
Running through the town (and effectively serving as its high street) is Stratford Road, which runs westwards towards Stony Stratford and eastwards towards Newport Pagnell (and is also known as Newport Road or Wolverton Road on parts of its route). The town is also served by some major grid roads, such as Grafton Street (V6), which runs southwards towards Central Milton Keynes and Bletchley, and Monks Way (H3, A422), which runs eastwards towards Newport Pagnell and Bedford.

Rail
 
The town is home to a railway station on the West Coast Main Line, though only local stopping trains call there.

A "toy town" wooden ticket office that stood on the railway bridge, facing out onto Stratford Road, with steps leading down to the platform was actually the third location for a station in Wolverton. The original temporary stop was on the embankment above Wolverton Park, a larger station and refreshment rooms were soon built at a location behind what is now Glyn Square.  In the 1880s the main line was re-routed to the east to allow for expansion and the current station site has been in use since. The wooden station stood here for over 100 years, however Milton Keynes Council did not nominate it to be a listed building and British Rail demolished it in 1991, putting a "temporary" unit on platform one instead.

Since then, passengers must use stairways connecting an overhead open walkway to access the other three platforms of the station, making them inaccessible to passengers with mobility impairments. The Council's 'Regeneration Strategy for Wolverton' aimed to build a new station in the original position on the road bridge over the railway.  But the new station was built at platform level, starting in summer 2011 and completed in summer 2012.

Bus
Wolverton is MK's main northern interchange point for cross-city and rural bus services. The town is served by Arriva bus numbers 4, 5, 6, 7, M5 and Stagecoach Group bus number 83.

Arriva's main bus garage is at Colts Holm Road, Old Wolverton.

Civil parish
Wolverton formed a civil parish within the Stratford and Wolverton Rural District from 1894 to 1919, that also contained the parishes of Calverton, Stony Stratford East and Stony Stratford West. The parishes had previously been part of the Potterspury Rural Sanitary District until it was disbanded in 1894. In 1919 these parishes, combined with New Bradwell, became part of the 'Stratford and Wolverton Urban District' (renamed the 'Wolverton Urban District' in 1920). This urban district would remain in existence until 1974 when it became part of the then District of Milton Keynes.

Today, Wolverton is the larger element of the modern parish of Wolverton and Greenleys.

Sport in Wolverton
The town's sports clubs include
 Wolverton Town Cricket Club: the club plays in Divisions 2 and 6 of The Oxford Times Cherwell League and play their home matches at the Cricket Ground on Osborne Street.
 Wolverton Town F.C., an amateur football club
 Wolverton Tennis Club
 Wolverton Town Bowls Club
 Wolverton Bowls Club
 Wolverton Pool & Sports Centre – The new centre is on the site of the former 'Wolverton Lido', an open-air pool open during the summer months.

Twin town 
 Comines-Warneton, Belgium. It was declared a sister city of Wolverton in 2006; this was partly initiated through the finding of letters from a 16-year-old soldier from Wolverton named Albert French. He is buried in Hyde Park Corner (Royal Berks) Cemetery at Comines-Warneton, just outside the village of Ploegsteert.

ONS urban sub-area (former)

For the 2001 census, the Office for National Statistics used the boundaries of the former Wolverton Urban District Council to designate an Urban Sub-area that it called Wolverton/Stony Stratford. The area covered included Stony Stratford CP, Wolverton and Greenleys CP, New Bradwell CP, Stantonbury CP and part of Great Linford CP. At the 2001 Census, the population of the Sub-area was 60,359. (For the 2011 census, the ONS ceased to use this designation in favour of a much larger 'Built-up Area Sub-Division' it called 'Milton Keynes', despite its excluding Bletchley.)

See also 
 Wolverton and Stony Stratford Tramway
 History of Milton Keynes

References

External links
 "Rides on Railways by Samuel Sidney" at Project Gutenberg. See pages 36 to 43 for a contemporary account (and critique) of the early years of the new railway town and the Works.
 Wolverton Words at the Living Archive project : Accents in Wolverton/New Bradwell and how they have changed between the generations, playground games, and memories of older Wolvertonians, as collected by Year7 children at Bushfield Middle School
 A Vision of Britain – Wolverton Urban District

 
Populated places on the River Great Ouse
Milton Keynes
Railway towns in England
Towns in Buckinghamshire